Maharaja Bodhchandra Singh or Bodhachandra Singh (1908–1955) was the last ruler of the Kingdom of Manipur. He ruled between 1941 and 15 October 1949. He married seven or nine women, his first wife being HH Srimati Maharani Tharendra Kishori (Rajkumari Ram Priya Devi), who died in 1942; she was daughter of the Raja of Bodo Khimedi.

During his lifetime, the Princely State of Manipur was extinguished and absorbed by the Government of India. He was succeeded by Maharaja Okendrajit Singh, but there were no further princes after the state was extinguished and the privileges of the native princes abolished.

See also

List of Manipuri kings
Manipur (princely state)
 Capt. M.K. Priya Brata Singh

References

Bibliography

Hodson, Thomas Callan.The Meitheis. Harvard University, 1908.

Meitei royalty
Hindu monarchs
1908 births
1955 deaths
Ningthoucha dynasty